Bhimtal Legislative Assembly constituency is one of the 70 Legislative Assembly constituencies of Uttarakhand state in India.

It is part of Nainital district.

Member of the Legislative Assembly

Election results

2022

2017

See also
 Mukteshwar (Uttarakhand Assembly constituency)

References

External links
 

Nainital district
Assembly constituencies of Uttarakhand